The 2021 24H GT Series powered by Hankook was the seventh season of the 24H Series with drivers battling for championship points and titles and the twelfth season since Creventic, the organiser and promoter of the series, organised multiple races a year. The races were contested with GT3-spec cars, GT4-spec cars, sports cars and 24H-Specials, like silhouette cars.

Calendar

Entry List

Race Results
Bold indicates overall winner.

Championship standings

Drivers' Overall

† – Drivers did not finish the race, but were classified as they completed over 60% of the class winner's race distance.

Teams' Overall

† – Drivers did not finish the race, but were classified as they completed over 60% of the class winner's race distance.

GT3-Pro Drivers'

† – Drivers did not finish the race, but were classified as they completed over 60% of the class winner's race distance.

GT3-Pro Teams'

† – Drivers did not finish the race, but were classified as they completed over 60% of the class winner's race distance.

GT3-Am Drivers'

† – Drivers did not finish the race, but were classified as they completed over 60% of the class winner's race distance.

GT3-Am Teams'

† – Drivers did not finish the race, but were classified as they completed over 60% of the class winner's race distance.

GTX Drivers'

† – Drivers did not finish the race, but were classified as they completed over 60% of the class winner's race distance.

GTX Teams'

† – Drivers did not finish the race, but were classified as they completed over 60% of the class winner's race distance.

991 Drivers'

† – Drivers did not finish the race, but were classified as they completed over 60% of the class winner's race distance.

991 Teams'

† – Drivers did not finish the race, but were classified as they completed over 60% of the class winner's race distance.

GT4 Drivers'

† – Drivers did not finish the race, but were classified as they completed over 60% of the class winner's race distance.

GT4 Teams'

† – Drivers did not finish the race, but were classified as they completed over 60% of the class winner's race distance.

See also
24H Series

Notes

References

External links

24H GT Series
24H GT Series